The Buhl Building is a skyscraper and class-A office center in Downtown Detroit, Michigan. Architect Wirt C. Rowland designed the Buhl in a Neo-Gothic style with Romanesque accents. Constructed in 1925, it stands at 26 stories in the Detroit Financial District across Congress Street from the Penobscot Building and across Griswold Street from the Guardian Building, all of which were designed by Wirt C. Rowland. The Buhl Building stands on the corner of Congress St. West, and Griswold St. in Downtown Detroit. The building stands atop what used to be the Savoyard Creek near its confluence with the Detroit River. In 1836, the creek was covered and turned into a sewer. The Savoyard Club occupied the 27th floor of the Buhl Building from 1928 until its membership dwindled and the club closed in 1994.

The Buhl Building houses the headquarters of SMART and the Detroit Transportation Corporation. Hubbell, Roth & Clark, a civil engineering firm, is also based in the building.

The Citizens Bank Building in downtown Saginaw, Michigan was modeled after the Buhl Building.

The architectural sculpture on the building was designed by Corrado Parducci.

Architect

Wirt C. Rowland, designer of the Penobscot Building, Guardian Building, and the Buhl Building was born and raised in Clinton, Michigan. In 1901, he landed a job as an office boy for the Detroit firm of Rogers & MacFarlane, quickly moving on to the prestigious George D. Mason firm. In 1909, he joined the office of Albert Kahn, who had also apprenticed under Mason. In 1910, with the encouragement of both Mason and Kahn, Rowland attended the Harvard Graduate School of Design in Cambridge, MA for a year.

The combination of Rowland's natural design talent, Harvard education, and Detroit's healthy economy positioned him to make major contributions to the city's architecture. Rowland is a case study in design attribution. In 1911, in the office of Kahn, he and Ernest Wilby are said to have been primarily responsible for the Hill Auditorium at the University of Michigan. Rowland worked for the local firm of Malcomson & Higginbotham until 1915. He then returned to Kahn's office, contributing to the firm's classic projects, namely the Hatcher Graduate Library at the University of Michigan, the Detroit News Building, the First National Building (1922), and the General Motors Building (1922) renamed Cadillac Place.

Rowland's career peaked as Head Designer (1922–1930) of Smith, Hinchman & Grylls (SmithGroup). There, he designed a dozen major structures in downtown Detroit; among these are a number of the city's most accomplished and evocative buildings. To a large extent, Rowland helped define Detroit's architectural genre. For the Guardian Building, he had assembled a multitude of artisans, mosaicists, sculptors, painters, and tile manufacturers including  Corrado Parducci, muralist Ezra Winter, and tile from the Rookwood and Pewabic pottery companies. He thus recreated the architectural synthesis of a medieval cathedral. Hence, Rowland had reached a climax when his Union Trust/Guardian Building became known as  "the Cathedral of Finance."

The Guardian Building opened in 1930. With the onset of the Great Depression, Rowland was laid off from Smith, Hinchman & Grylls. As a result, he formed his own office where his work decreased to a small number of churches, schools and construction projects. Late in life, he returned to a purer, Gothic idiom for his last few projects, notably the Kirk in the Hills church which was built after he died in 1946. During World War II, the Guardian Building would serve as headquarters for wartime production.

William Edward Kapp, architect for the firm of Smith, Hinchman & Grylls has been credited with interior design work on the Buhl Building.

Tenants
Suburban Mobility Authority for Regional Transportation has its headquarters in the building, and the Consulate of Italy in Detroit is located in Suite 1840. Fink + Associates Law's Detroit office is located in Suite 1000.

At one time Real Times Media, the owner of black newspapers in the US, had its headquarters in the building.

Michigan Nonprofit Association, a statewide membership organization that serves the nonprofit sector, has its Metro Detroit office in the Buhl Building.

Gallery

See also
List of tallest buildings in Detroit

References

Further reading

 Kvaran, Einar Einarsson, Shadowing Parducci, unpublished manuscript, Detroit.

External links

Official Website (Caution: Macromedia Flash is required to enter)
"Where Detroit's elite met to eat" (Archive). The Detroit News. October 12, 2004.

Skyscraper office buildings in Detroit
Downtown Detroit
Historic district contributing properties in Michigan
National Register of Historic Places in Detroit
Office buildings on the National Register of Historic Places in Michigan
1925 establishments in Michigan
1920s architecture in the United States
Buildings with sculpture by Corrado Parducci
Art Deco architecture in Michigan
Office buildings completed in 1925